Grøndahl or Gröndahl or Grondahl is a surname. Notable people with the surname include:

Agathe Backer-Grøndahl (1847–1907), Norwegian pianist and composer
Britta Gröndahl (1914–2002), Swedish writer and anarcho-syndicalist
Cathrine Grøndahl (born 1969), Norwegian poet
Jan Grøndahl (born 1934), Norwegian police chief and civil servant
Jens Christian Grøndahl (born 1959), Danish writer
Kåre Grøndahl Hagem (1915–2008), Norwegian politician for the Conservative Party
Kelpo Gröndahl (1920–1994), Finnish wrestler from Pori in the Satakunta region
Kirsti Kolle Grøndahl (born 1943), Norwegian politician for the Labour Party, currently County Governor of Buskerud
Launy Grøndahl (1886–1960), Danish composer and conductor
Mick Grøndahl (born 1968), Danish-American bass guitarist
Roope Gröndahl (born 1989), Finnish pianist trained at the Sibelius Academy

See also
18016 Grondahl (1999 JU122) is a main-belt asteroid discovered on May 13, 1999
Bing & Grøndahl, Danish porcelain manufacturer founded in 1853 by the sculptor Frederik Vilhelm Grøndahl and merchant brothers Meyer Hermann Bing and Jacob Herman Bing